is a Japanese anime television series created by Takashi Nakamura and produced by Nippon Animation. It first aired in Japan across TV Tokyo between October 4, 2004 and March 28, 2005, totaling 26 episodes. There was an extended ending special released only on DVD.

The series was later translated and dubbed by Animax into English for broadcast across its English-language networks in Southeast Asia and South Asia. It is licensed in North America by Bandai Entertainment, who also produced a separate English dub for release in the region.

Plot
The series opens with the introduction of a group of white-haired children, known as the "Befort Children", named after "Befort", a fictional village in Belgium where their existence was first recorded in 1489. This group of enigmatic children has been spotted at different times and places in Europe for over 500 years. Always with the appearance of 11-year-olds, they behave far more mature than they should be, never grow old, and seem to have supernatural power.

Then the story starts to unfold in 2012 by introducing Helga, an introverted 11-year-old orphan who drew pictures of a land with a crescent moon that she believed was her home. Her playmate and only friend in the orphanage, Chitto, wants to help Helga find it. So together they escape from the orphanage and set out on a journey in which they meet Tohma, an energetic boy in his home, Papin Island. There Tohma tries to befriend them but misunderstands Helga and becomes hostile to her. Later he is mesmerized by Helga's bravery in rescuing Chitto from a group of poisonous insects. Tohma, through his desire to help the two runaway orphans, ventures out on a quest that will eventually cross paths with the mission of the Befort Children, who have spent centuries wandering Europe in search of a person named Tina. As they go further they come to realize a truth far more great and entwined with many other mysterious characters.

Characters

 is the series protagonist. He is an enthusiastic and energetic young boy who lives with his parents on the shores of Papin Island. 

 is a quiet and introverted young girl, whom Tohma helps save from an oppressive orphanage. She is in search of a place which is the source of her paintings. 

 is a good-hearted young boy, who is an earnest and steadfast friend to Helga, and her best friend at the orphanage. 

The  is led by Gherta Hawksbee. Gherta uses Conrad Röntgen's findings to reconstruct the Autozone, a machine which brings people back from the Zone, the land of the dead, using Orsel, the life force in all living things. Because of the high levels of Orsel required to bring someone back, however, a person can become very unstable and the Orsel can turn into a sort of weapon. Later, the GED is manipulated by Dumas so that he can send Tina's spirit back to her old body, though this plan does not work.

Production

Staff
 Executive producer: Kōichi Motohashi
 Original creator, character designs and director: Takashi Nakamura
 Planning: Takuo Minegeshi, Michio Katō
 Planning coordination: Shin Unozawa, Kenichi Iyadomi, Shirō Sasaki
 Production manager: Shigeo Endō
 Script: Hideki Mitsui, Takashi Nakamura
 Art director: Nizo Yamamoto
 Art assistance: Osamu Masuyama, Akemi Imano
 Chief animation director: Miyuki Nakamura
 Storyboards: Katsumi Terahigashi, Hiroshi Fukutomi, Masaki Sugiyama
 Episode directors: Hiroshi Kaburagi, Kenichi Nishida, Kenichi Shimizu, Yoshimi Tsuda
 Animation directors: Kōichi Maruyama, Tetsurō Aoki, Hitoshi Haga, Yasuko Sakuma, Norihiro Naganuma
 Director of photography: Seiichi Morishita
 Color designs: Mayumi Satō
 Color designations: Yumi Asano, Makiko Nishidate
 Music: Kōji Ueno
 Sound director: Hiroyuki Hayase
 Music producer: Yūko Sakurai (Victor Entertainment)
 Music coordination: TV Tokyo Music
 Producer: Kenichi Satō
 Production: Hakuhodo DY Media Partners, Nippon Animation, FC Project

Soundtrack

The series' soundtrack was composed by Kōji Ueno. A CD containing a total of 27 tracks was released on March 14, 2006, under the title Fantastic Children: A Gift from Greecia. It included both the opening theme of the show, "Voyage" (performed by Inori, lyrics by Mikio Sakai, composition by Mayumi Yamazaki, arrangement by Takanori Eguchi), and the ending theme,  (performed by Origa, lyrics by Rie Hamada, composition and arrangement by Kunihiko Ryo).

Adaptations

Manga
, illustrated by Masakazu Miyano, was serialized in the monthly Comic Flapper. It was collected in two volumes.

Video game
The Fantastic Children video game was released for the Game Boy Advance on May 19, 2005 by Bandai. Developed by Inti Creates, the game follows Tohma through his adventures from Papen Island with Helga, Chitto and the Befort Children.

References

External links
 Fantastic Children Official Japanese site
 Fantastic Children Official game site
 
 

2004 anime television series debuts
Adventure anime and manga
Anime with original screenplays
Bandai Entertainment anime titles
Nippon Animation
Romance anime and manga
Science fiction anime and manga
Seinen manga
Odex